Donald R. Kojis (January 15, 1939 – November 19, 2021) was an American professional basketball player who played twelve seasons in the National Basketball Association (NBA)..

Career
Born in Milwaukee, Wisconsin, he attended Marquette University and was drafted by the Chicago Packers in the second round (12th pick) of the 1961 NBA draft. He played forward for the Baltimore Bullets (1963–64), Detroit Pistons (1964–66), Chicago Bulls (1966–67) (acquired prior to the season via the expansion draft), San Diego Rockets (1967–70) (acquired prior to the 1967–68 season via the expansion draft), Seattle SuperSonics (1970–72) and Kansas City-Omaha Kings (1972–75). 

Kojis was one of three players ever selected in expansion drafts held in consecutive years (Bob Weiss and George Wilson being the other two). Kojis was also one of a small number of players who played for three expansion teams (Kojis playing for the 1961–62 Packers, the 1966–67 Bulls, and the 1967–68 Rockets).

He was named to the 1968 and 1969 NBA West All-Star Teams.

He holds the Pistons' record for most field goal attempts per 48 minutes (25.35).

In 12 seasons he played in 814 Games, had 19,241 Minutes Played, 3,947 Field Goals Made, 8,853 Field Goals Attempted, .446 Field Goal Percentage, 2,054 Free Throws Made, 2,853 Free Throws Attempted, .720 Free Throw Percentage, 4,555 Rebounds, 1,112 Assists, 1,937 Personal Fouls and 9,948 Points.

He played for the United States men's national basketball team at the 1963 FIBA World Championship.

Personal life
Kojis resided in the San Diego County community of Julian, California and was the director of Whispering Winds Catholic Conference Center.
He died on November 19, 2021, at the age of 82.

References

External links

basketpedya.com

1939 births
2021 deaths
American men's basketball players
Baltimore Bullets (1963–1973) players
Basketball players at the 1963 Pan American Games
Basketball players from Milwaukee
Chicago Packers draft picks
Chicago Bulls expansion draft picks
Chicago Bulls players
Detroit Pistons players
Kansas City Kings players
Marquette Golden Eagles men's basketball players
Medalists at the 1963 Pan American Games
National Basketball Association All-Stars
Pan American Games gold medalists for the United States
Pan American Games medalists in basketball
People from Julian, California
Phillips 66ers players
San Diego Rockets expansion draft picks
San Diego Rockets players
Seattle SuperSonics players
Small forwards
United States men's national basketball team players
1963 FIBA World Championship players